The 2021 UC Santa Barbara Gauchos baseball team represented University of California, Santa Barbara during the 2021 NCAA Division I baseball season. The Gauchos play their home games at Caesar Uyesaka Stadium as a member of the Big West Conference. They are led by head coach Andrew Checketts, in his tenth year as head coach.

Previous season
The 2020 UC Santa Barbara Gauchos baseball team notched a 13–2 (0–0) regular-season record. The season prematurely ended on March 12, 2020, due to concerns over the COVID-19 pandemic.

Schedule and results

Tucson Regional

2021 MLB Draft

References 

2021 Big West Conference baseball season
2021
2021 in sports in California
Uc Santa Barbara Gauchos